The town of Sendawar is the administrative seat of West Kutai Regency, East Kalimantan, Indonesia.

Climate
Sendawar has a tropical rainforest climate (Af) with heavy to very heavy rainfall year-round.

References

West Kutai Regency
Regency seats of East Kalimantan
Populated places in East Kalimantan